Han Zhiqiang (born November 1963) is a Chinese diplomat currently serving as Chinese ambassador to Thailand. He was Chinese ambassador to Fiji from 2008 to 2011.

Biography
Han was born in Yitong Manchu Autonomous County, Jilin, in November 1963. He graduatedfrom Jilin University, majoring in Japanese. After university, he was despatched to the Ministry of Foreign Affairs, becoming deputy director of the General Office in 2005. He once served as secretary to Minister Tang Jiaxuan. In November 2008, he succeeded  as Chinese ambassador to Fiji, serving until June 2011. He was Chinese envoy to Japan in July 2011, and held that office until February 2016. In February 2016, he was recalled to the original department and promoted to the director position. In August 2021, he was appointed Chinese ambassador to Thailand, replacing .

References

1963 births
Living people
People from Siping
Jilin University alumni
People's Republic of China politicians from Jilin
Chinese Communist Party politicians from Jilin
Ambassadors of China to Fiji
Ambassadors of China to Thailand